Léon François Comerre (10 October 1850 – 20 February 1916) was a French academic painter, famous for his portraits of beautiful women and Oriental themes.

Life

Comerre was born in Trélon, in the Département du Nord, the son of a schoolteacher. He moved to Lille with his family in 1853. From an early age he showed an interest in art and became a student of Alphonse Colas at the École des Beaux-Arts in Lille, winning a gold medal in 1867. From 1868 a grant from the Département du Nord allowed him to continue his studies in Paris at the famous École nationale supérieure des Beaux-Arts in the studio of Alexandre Cabanel. There he came under the influence of orientalism.

Comerre first exhibited at the Paris Salon in 1871 and went on to win prizes there in 1875 and 1881. In 1875, he won the Grand Prix de Rome for his painting "L’Ange annonçant aux bergers la naissance du Christ" (The Angel announcing the birth of Christ to the shepherds). This led to a scholarship at the French Academy in Rome from January 1876 to December 1879. In 1885 he won a prize at the "Exposition Universelle" in Antwerp. He also won prestigious art prizes in the USA (1876) and Australia (1881 and 1897). He became a Knight of the Legion of Honour in 1903.

He exhibited in London at the Royal Academy and the Royal Society of Portrait Painters, and in Glasgow at the Glasgow Institute of the Fine Arts.

In 1884, he moved to Vésinet, a suburb of Paris, where he remained until his death in 1916.

His wife Jacqueline Comerre-Paton was also a painter. His nephew was the renowned artist Albert Gleizes.

A catalogue raisonné of Comerre's work was published in 1980 by Les Presses Artistiques, Paris.

Major works

1875: L'Annonce aux bergers
1878: Jézabel dévorée par les chiens
1878: Junon
1879: Le Lion amoureux
1880: Portrait de Jeune Fille
1881: Samson et Dalila
1882: Albine morte
1882: L' Étoile
1883: Silène et les Bacchantes
1883: Portrait de Mademoiselle Achille Fould
1884: Madeleine
1884: Pierrot
1888: Le Printemps, le Destin et l'Hiver (triptyque)
1903: À bicyclette au Vésinet

Notes

External links

Biog of Leon Comerre (askart.com)
Paintings by Leon Comerre (Art Renewal Center Museum)

19th-century French painters
20th-century French painters
20th-century French male artists
1850 births
1916 deaths
Burials at Père Lachaise Cemetery
French male painters
Prix de Rome for painting
Orientalist painters
19th-century French male artists